The Antiquary: A Magazine Devoted to the Study of the Past was a monthly antiquarian magazine published from December 1879 to 1915, in London by Elliot Stock and in New York City by J W Bouton.

Its editors were:
 Edward Walford, 1880
 (G.B. Leathom), 1881–1889
 John Charles Cox, 1890–1895?
 Thomas Macall Fallow, 1895–1899
 George Latimer Apperson, 1899–1915

References

External links
 Volume 6, July-December 1882, at Internet Archive.

Archaeology magazines
Monthly magazines published in the United Kingdom
English-language magazines
History magazines published in the United Kingdom
Magazines published in London
Magazines established in 1879
Magazines disestablished in 1915
Defunct magazines published in the United Kingdom